Joel Edward Danies (Born April 1, 1958, in Jacmel, Haiti) is a career foreign service officer who served concurrently as the US Ambassador Extraordinary and Plenipotentiary to Gabon and São Tomé and Príncipe from 2018–2019.

Education
Danies earned a B.S. in Zoology/Animal Biology at Loyola College, Maryland (1977), a B.A. in Political Science and Government at the University of Maryland, College Park, (1979) and an M.S. in National Security Strategy at the National War College in 2010.

Career
Immediately prior to his ambassadorship, Danies was associate dean of the School of Professional and Area Studies, a unit of the Foreign Service Institute. While chargé d'affaires in Belmopan, Belize, during and after Hurricane Mitch in October 1998, Danies declared the area a disaster area in order to allow U.S. aid to arrive. He joined the State Department in 1987 after working for USAir.

Personal life
Danies speaks French, Haitian Creole, and Arabic.

References

1958 births
Living people
People from Jacmel
Ambassadors of the United States to Gabon
Ambassadors of the United States to São Tomé and Príncipe
Ambassadors of the United States to Belize
Loyola University Maryland alumni
University of Maryland, College Park alumni
National War College alumni
Deans (academic)
Trump administration personnel
Haitian emigrants to the United States
21st-century American diplomats